The 2019-20 Bemidji State Beavers men's ice hockey season was the 64th season of play for the program, the 21st at the Division I level and the 10th in the WCHA conference. The Beavers represented Bemidji State University and were coached by Tom Serratore, in his 19th season.

The team's season ended abruptly when the WCHA announced that the remainder of the tournament was cancelled due to the COVID-19 pandemic in the United States on March 12, 2020.

Roster
As of September 9, 2019.

Standings

Schedule and results

|-
!colspan=12 style=";" | Regular Season

|-
!colspan=12 style=";" | 

|-
!colspan=12 style=";" | 

|- align="center" bgcolor="#e0e0e0"
|colspan=12|Bemidji State Won Series 2–1
|- align="center" bgcolor="#e0e0e0"
|colspan=12|Remainder of Tournament Cancelled

Scoring statistics

Goaltending statistics

Rankings

References

Bemidji State Beavers men's ice hockey seasons
Bemidji State Beavers
Bemidji State Beavers
Bemidji State Beavers
Bemidji State Beavers